Tiptoe Tapdance is a solo album by pianist Hank Jones recorded in 1977 and 1978 for the Galaxy label.

Reception

AllMusic awarded the album 3 stars, stating: "The emphasis is on ballads and his treatments of these songs (which include three religious pieces) are respectful, melodic and lightly swinging. There is not much variety here but the music (within its limitations) is enjoyable".

Track listing
 "I Didn't Know What Time It Was" (Lorenz Hart, Richard Rodgers) - 4:20
 "Emily" (Johnny Mandel, Johnny Mercer) - 3:12
 "Sweet Lorraine" (Cliff Burwell, Mitchell Parish) - 4:05
 "Two Sleepy People" (Hoagy Carmichael, Frank Loesser) - 5:37
 "I'll Be Around" (Alec Wilder) - 1:34
 "It's Me, O Lord (Standin' in the Need of Prayer)" (Traditional) - 4:57
 "Love Divine, All Loves Surpassing" (Charles Wesley) - 3:23
 "Memories of You" (Eubie Blake, Andy Razaf) - 4:51
 "Lord, I Want to Be a Christian" (Traditional) - 5:21

Personnel 
Hank Jones - piano

References 

1978 albums
Hank Jones albums
Galaxy Records albums
Solo piano jazz albums